Hamza Division may refer to:
Hamza Division (Aleppo)
Hamza Division (Daraa)